Albertonectes is an extinct genus of elasmosaurid plesiosaur known from the Late Cretaceous (middle upper Campanian stage) Bearpaw Formation of Alberta, Canada. It contains a single species, Albertonectes vanderveldei. Albertonectes is the longest elasmosaur, and more generally plesiosaur, known to date both in neck and total body length.

Discovery

Albertonectes is known solely from the holotype TMP 2007.011.0001, a complete well preserved postcranial skeleton housed at the Royal Tyrrell Museum of Palaeontology in Drumheller, Alberta. Elements include all 132 vertebrae from the atlas-axis complex to fused tip of the tail vertebrae, complete pectoral and incomplete pelvic girdles, almost complete forelimbs and hindlimbs, disarticulated ribs, a gastralium, and at least 97 associated gastroliths. TMP 2007.011.0001 was discovered during mining for gem-quality ammonite shell called Ammolite by Korite International Ltd. about 150 meters south of the St. Mary River near Lethbridge in southern Alberta. The specimen was excavated in a nearly completely articulated state from dark gray claystone in a concretionary horizon about 15 m above the base of the Bearpaw Formation and about 2 m below an ash bed known by mine workers as the "10 inch bentonite". Collected from the lower part of Muddy Unit 1 of the St. Mary River Section, just below the lowest known local occurrence of Baculites compressus in the formation, the specimen is not younger than about 73.5 million years old and approximately of that age, thus dating to the middle of the upper Campanian stage of the Late Cretaceous.

Etymology
Albertonectes was first described and named by Tai Kubo, Mark T. Mitchell and Donald M. Henderson in 2012 and the type species is Albertonectes vanderveldei. The generic name is derived from Alberta, in reference to the Canadian province where the holotype was found, and from Greek nectes, meaning "swimmer", a common suffix for genus names of plesiosaurians. The specific name honors the late Rene Vandervelde, the founder of Korite International, the gem-mining company that discovered the holotype.

Description

Albertonectes is also unique among other elasmosaurids in having 76 neck vertebrae, a record number among elasmosaurids. Callawayasaurus with a similar count of 56 lacks the dumbbell-shaped articular faces that are present on the vertebrae of Vegasaurus. Additional traits rarely seen in other elasmosaurids include: a tapered front-side projection on the pubis that extends to the side beyond the acetabulum, a longitudinal ridge on the side of most neck vertebrae up to cervical 69, a clavicular arch that is wider than the adjacent front edge of the scapula, the lack of pectoral and pelvic bar, a tip of the tail that is made of seven fused tail vertebrae, and a slender humerus with a width-to-length ratio of 0.56, among other traits.

Albertonectes is known from a mature individual, as suggested by the fused neural spines and most cervical ribs to their centra, and by the only partial connection between the trochanter and the capitulum (head) of the femur, seen in TMP 2007.011.0001. Other observation also support an adult age, e.g. rough and wrinkled vertebral surfaces as well as well-developed facets and articulations on its wrist and ankle bones.

Phylogeny
Kubo et al. (2012) tested the phylogenetic position of Albertonectes using a highly modified version of Sato (2002)'s data-set, however its position wasn't stable and many elasmosaurids formed rather large polytomies. This analysis was modified by O’Gorman et al. (2015), and the cladogram below follows their results, showing only the relationships within Elasmosauridae.

See also

 Timeline of plesiosaur research
 List of plesiosaur genera

References

Fossil taxa described in 2012
Elasmosaurids
Late Cretaceous plesiosaurs of North America
Sauropterygian genera